The Arado Ar 76 was a German aircraft of the 1930s, designed as a light fighter with a secondary role as an advanced trainer in mind.

Development
Arado's response to a requirement by the Reichsluftfahrtministerium (RLM) for a light / emergency fighter aircraft, was the Ar 76 which was evaluated against the Heinkel He 74, Focke-Wulf Fw 56, the Henschel Hs 121 and Hs 125 in 1935. Although the Fw 56 was selected for the main production contract, the RLM was sufficiently impressed by the Ar 76 to order a small number of production aircraft as well.

Design
The Ar 76 was a parasol-wing monoplane with fixed, tailwheel undercarriage. The wings were constructed of fabric-covered wood, and the fuselage was fabric-covered steel tube.

When used as a fighter the Ar 76 was armed with twin 7.92mm MG 17 machine guns which were mounted above the engine and each had access to 250 rounds. However when used as an advanced trainer, it only carried a single MG 17. Alongside this it could also carry two  SC 10 bombs, one under each wing.

Operational history
Production Ar 76A aircraft were used by Jagdfliegerschulen (fighter pilot schools) from 1936.

Variants
Data from:
Ar 76a
First prototype, (regn. D-ISEN).
Ar 76 V2
Second prototype, (regn. D-IRAS).
Ar 76 V3
Third prototype.
Ar 76A
Single-seat advanced trainer, lightweight fighter aircraft. Built in small numbers.

Operators

Luftwaffe

Specifications (Ar 76A-0)

See also

References

Citations

Bibliography

World Aircraft Information Files. Brightstar Aerospace Publishing, London. File 889 Sheet 69.

Arado Ar 076
Arado Ar 076
Ar 076
Parasol-wing aircraft
Single-engined tractor aircraft
Aircraft first flown in 1934